Pseudocopivaleria is a genus of moths of the family Noctuidae. The genus was erected by John S. Buckett and William R. Bauer in 1966.

Species
 Pseudocopivaleria anaverta Buckett & Bauer, 1966
 Pseudocopivaleria sonoma (McDunnough, 1941)

References

Cuculliinae